Fords Bridge is a remote outback village in northwestern New South Wales, Australia. It is 824 km northwest of Sydney, and 67.5 km west of Bourke.

References 

Bourke Shire
Towns in New South Wales